Mount Saint Mary's Convent and Academy, originally the Sacred Heart Convent and Holy Angels Orphanage and previously Mount St. Mary's Convent and Orphan Asylum, and also known as Mount Saint Mary's Academy and Convent, is the only extant original orphanage in California and commemorates the Sisters of Mercy, in Grass Valley, Nevada County, California.

The Gothic Revival Style Victorian building with Georgian Revival accents currently houses the Grass Valley Museum,  at 410 South Church Street between Chapel and Dalton Streets, Grass Valley.

History
Katherine Russell (sister of Charles Russell, Baron Russell of Killowen and better known as Mother Mary Baptist Russell, or simply "Mother Baptist") arrived in San Francisco with seven other Sisters of Mercy on 1854-12-08 from Kinsale, County Cork, Ireland; other Sisters followed.  On 1863-08-20, spearheaded by vicar-general Father Thomas Dalton, five Sisters, including Mother Baptist, arrived in Grass Valley to help the California Gold Rush miners' orphans. Bishop Eugene O'Connell placed the cornerstone for the convent/orphanage building on Sunday, 1865-05-02. The Sisters moved in on 1866-03-20, and the first orphans were taken in on 1866-04-02.

The orphanage closed in 1932 and the facility was de-sanctified in 1968.  The following year, in 1969, the Grass Valley Historic Preservation Committee began repair and preservation of the building and the Sisters' rose garden. The Foley Library for Historical Research in nearby Nevada City, California retains historical documents for Mount St. Mary's.

Construction
The building is three stories tall, and was built at a cost of $19,856, including construction and interior furnishings.
 First floor - Construction:  stone.  Use:  classrooms, dining room, kitchen, laundry, lavatory, store rooms.
 Second floor - Construction:  brick.  Use:  chapel, classrooms, library, parlors.
 Third floor - Construction: brick.  Use: dormitories, sleeping quarters, infirmary.

Landmark designation
This Nevada County building is honored as on the National Register of Historic Places and as California Historical Landmark No. 855, registered in 1972-04-24. The plaque's inscription states:
Mount Saint Mary's Convent and Academy
Built by Reverend Thomas J. Dalton, the Sacred Heart Convent and Holy Angels Orphanage was dedicated May 2, 1865 by Bishop Eugene O'Connell. Under the Sisters of Mercy, it served from 1866 to 1932 as the first orphanage of the Northern Mines. It functioned as an academy from 1868 to 1965 and as a convent from 1866 to 1968.

The plaque was placed on the building on October 28, 1972 by the California Department of Parks and Recreation.

See also
National Register of Historic Places listings in Nevada County, California
California Historical Landmarks in Nevada County

References

External links
Grass Valley History Museum

Grass Valley, California
Museums in Nevada County, California
History museums in California
Convents in the United States
Orphanages in the United States
California Historical Landmarks
National Register of Historic Places in Nevada County, California
Properties of religious function on the National Register of Historic Places in California
Buildings and structures in Nevada County, California
Historic American Buildings Survey in California
Religious organizations established in 1866
1866 establishments in California
Gothic Revival architecture in California
Georgian Revival architecture in California
Victorian architecture in California